Moritz Thiem (born 8 December 1999) is an inactive Austrian tennis player.

Thiem has a career high ATP singles ranking of 1225 achieved on 30 September 2019.

Thiem made his ATP main draw debut at the 2019 Generali Open Kitzbühel in the doubles draw partnering Nicolás Massú.

He is the younger brother of fellow tennis player Dominic Thiem.

References

External links

1999 births
Living people
Austrian male tennis players